If You Were Me: Anima Vision 2 is a 2008 South Korean animated film.

Reception
It was nominated for the Asia Pacific Screen Award for Best Animated Feature Film at the 2nd Asia Pacific Screen Awards.

References

External links
 

2008 films
South Korean animated films
2008 animated films
2000s South Korean films